The Elsbett engine is an 89 HP, direct-injection diesel engine designed to run on  straight vegetable oil. The engine is also known as Elko engine (for "Elsbett Konstruktion") and was invented by Ludwig Elsbett.

The design limits the loss of energy as heat by a variety of technologies;
 the fuel charge is injected in such a manner as to 'blend perfectly with the air' and combust within a central core of hot air, not contacting the chamber walls, which is necessary for good air/fuel with other designs examined. The Elsbett engine has a deep bowl which has a slight lip
 the engine also doesn't use any water cooling. Instead, only oil is used as a coolant fluid. No water cooling of the engine block was required, and only an oil cooler was used to cool down the oil circulating.

Elsbett AG is based in Thalmaessing, Bavaria, Germany.

References

External links 
 Main Website (german)
 Website (german) Elsbett-museum

Piston engines
Diesel engines
Flexible-fuel vehicles